The Players' Championship is one of the final events on the World Curling Tour (WCT) and is a part of the Grand Slam of Curling.

From 2016 to 2019, it was the penultimate slam of the curling season, and the last of the four "majors". The event was one of the original Grand Slam events when they were instituted in the 2001–02 season for men and for the 2006–07 season for women.

History
The event began as the "VO Cup" before the Grand Slam era in 1993, as part of the very first World Curling Tour season. The event was known as the VO Cup for two seasons before title sponsor Seagram's Distillery pulled out. With no sponsor, the 1995 event was saved at the last minute, and continued the next season thanks to a TV deal with TSN.

A women's event was introduced in 2006.

From 2007 to 2009, it was a qualifying tournament for the Canadian Olympic Curling Trials, and had barred foreign teams from entering (unlike the other Slams). Scotland's Eve Muirhead became the first non-Canadian skip to win the event in 2013, while Sweden's Niklas Edin became the first non Canadian skip to win the men's event in 2017.

To date, Edmonton's Kevin Martin has won the most Players' Championships with 8. On the women's side, Winnipeg's Jennifer Jones (and her long-time second, Jill Officer) have won the most championships with 6.

Due to the COVID-19 pandemic, both the 2020 Players' Championship and the 2020 Champions Cup were cancelled.

Qualification
The top 12 teams on the men's and women's WCT year-to-date rankings respectively qualify for the event. Teams that decline their invitations are replaced by the next highest ranked team.

Format
The 2022 event was a triple knockout. From 2014 to 2019, the event featured 12 teams split into two pools of six which competed in a round robin. The top 8 teams advance to a single game elimination playoff. The event has been held in its current format since 2014. In 2021, the number of teams earning playoff berths was reduced to six.

Past champions

Men

Women

References

External links

Players' Championship
Men's Grand Slam (curling) events
Women's Grand Slam (curling) events
Annual sporting events in Canada